As polytheistic systems evolve, there is a tendency for one deity to achieve preeminence as king of the gods. This tendency can parallel the growth of hierarchical systems of political power in which a monarch eventually comes to assume ultimate authority for human affairs. Other gods come to serve in a Divine Council or pantheon; such subsidiary courtier-deities are usually linked by family ties from the union of a single husband or wife, or else from an androgynous divinity who is responsible for the creation.

Historically, subsequent social events, such as invasions or shifts in power structures, can cause the previous king of the gods to be displaced by a new divinity, who assumes the displaced god's attributes and functions. Frequently the king of the gods has at least one wife who is the queen of the gods.

According to feminist theories of the replacement of original matriarchies by patriarchies, male sky gods tend to supplant female earth goddesses and achieve omnipotence.

There is also a tendency for kings of the gods to assume more and more importance, syncretistically assuming the attributes and functions of lesser divinities, who come to be seen as aspects of the single supreme deity.

King of the gods in different cultures
Examples of this displacement of kings of the gods include:
 In the Mesopotamian Anunnaki, Enlil displaces Anu and is in turn replaced by Marduk.
 In the Ancient Egyptian religion, Amun-Ra was the official deity of the Pharaoh and the people of Egypt. 
 In the Canaanite pantheon, Baal (Hadad) displaces El.
 In the Hurrian/Hittite pantheon, Teshub or Tarḫunz or Arinna displaces Kumarbi.
 In the Armenian Ar, later – Aramazd.
 In Hinduism, the King of the Gods is Indra, The God of Thunder and lightning and the ruler of heaven. 

 In the Ancient Greek system of Olympian Gods, Cronus displaces Uranus, and Zeus in turn displaces Cronus
 In Norse mythology, Odin assumes the role as the Allfather or King of the Gods, but Norse mythology has multiple tribes of Gods such as the Æsir and Vanir, and Odin starts off as only the leader of the former.
 Ancient Iranian Ahura Mazda of the Zoroastrians
Dravidian religions: the Supreme Being in Dravidian religion was usually Sivaperuman and had supreme gods based on lands including Murugan, Kadalon, Vendhan, Kotravai, and Thirumal

List of rulers of pantheons
The leaders of the various pantheons include:

 Amazigh pantheon: old: Amun; new: Poseidon
 Algonquin pantheon: Gitche Manitou
 Arabian pantheon: Allah
 Ashanti pantheon: Nyame
 Australian Aboriginal pantheon: Baiame
 Aztec pantheon: Huitzilopochtli, Ometeotl, Quetzalcoatl or Tezcatlipoca
 Basque pantheon: Sugaar or Mari
 Batak pantheon: (primordial) Debata Ompung Mulajadi na Bolon; (celestial) Batara Guru
 Canaanite pantheon: El, later Baʿal (now usually identified with Hadad)
 Carthaginian pantheon: Baʿal Hammon
 Celtic pantheon: Dagda (Gaels); possibly Lugus (Brythonic/Gallaeci/Gaulish)
 Chinese pantheon: Yuanshi Tianzun, Jade Emperor, Shangdi, Tian
 Circassian pantheon: Theshxwe / Tha
 Dahomey pantheon: Nana Buluku
 Dravidian pantheon: Sivan, Murugan, Kadalon, Vendhan and Kottravai, and Thirumaal 
 Egyptian pantheon: Old Kingdom: Ra. New Kingdom: Amun 
 Finnic pantheon: Ukko, possibly Ilmarinen
 Germanic pantheon: Odin
 Georgian pantheon: Armazi, Ghmerti
 Gondi pantheon: Kupar Lingo
 Greek pantheon: Zeus
 Guarani pantheon: Tupa
 Haida pantheon: Raven
 Hawaiian pantheon: Kāne
 Hindu pantheon: Shiva, Brahma, Vishnu, Indra or Brahman
 Hittite pantheon: Arinna or Teshub
 Hopi pantheon: Angwusnasomtaka
 Inca pantheon: Viracocha 
 Inuit pantheon: Anguta or Anigut but only among the Greenlandic Inuit
 Japanese pantheon: Amenominakanushi, Izanagi-no-Mikoto, then Amaterasu-Ōmikami
 Korean pantheon: Haneullim
 Lakota pantheon: Wakan Tanka or Inyan
 Lithuanian pantheon: Perkūnas
 Lusitanian pantheon: Endovelicus
 Mari pantheon: Kugu Jumo
 Māori pantheon: Tāne
 Mayan pantheon: Hunab Ku, Itzamna, Huracan, Kukulcan
 Mbuti pantheon: Khonvoum
 Meitei pantheon: Sidaba Mapu or Pakhangba
 Mesopotamian pantheon: Sumerian: An, later Enlil; Babylonian: Marduk
 Miwok pantheon: Coyote
 Muisca pantheon: Chiminigagua
 Nabatean pantheon: Dushara
 Ossetian pantheon: Xucau
 Persian pantheon: Ahura Mazda
 Philippine pantheon: Bathala (Tagalog), Kan-Laon (Visayan)
 Roman pantheon: Jupiter
 Sami pantheon: Beaivi
 Slavic pantheon: Perun
 Turco-Mongol pantheon: Tengri, Tngri, Qormusta Tengri
 Vietnamese pantheon: Ông Trời; Lạc Long Quân
 Vodou pantheon: Bondyé
 Yahwist pantheon: El, later Yahweh (via syncretism)
 Yoruba pantheon: Olorun
 Zulu pantheon: Unkulunkulu, Umvelinqangi

Characteristics
The following are the characteristics shared by virtually all Kings of the gods:
 Creation: Most of these gods derive their power from the fact that they created the world, formulated its laws and/or created life forms, notably humans. Ex: Ra, Odin.
 Dominion over the sky: Many such deities hold control over all aspects of the sky, such as weather, rain, thunderstorms, air, winds and celestial objects like stars. They also control some aspects of Earth like harvest, fertility, plants or mountains. Ex: Zeus, Indra, Perun.
 Lightning bolts as personal weapons: Commonly seen with sky gods.
 Divine Wisdom: Some Kings of Gods possess superior wisdom and clairvoyance, compared to most beings. Ex: Ra, Odin.
 God of the Sun, Daylight or Celestial Fire: Some kings of gods are associated with the Sun, as it is life giving and is a powerful symbol of order. They are said to be in charge of celestial fire, which is purifying by nature. Daylight is also an important phenomenon, as most events take place under its presence. Ex: Ra, Dyaus Pitr.
 Conquest, Law, Justice, Order, Time and Fate: Most kings of gods have the ability to control the events of battle and grant victory to those who deserve it. They are seen as paragons of law and promote order. They are seen as powerful manifestations of their respective civilizations. Some gods either possess great skill in war or tremendous physical strength. Some of them have some control over time and regulate it with seasons. Others have limited control over the fate of a human. Ex: Zeus, Odin, Ra, Indra.
 Divine authority over other gods: This may be because the concerned head of the pantheon is the father or creator of many gods and goddesses who swear allegiance to him. As a result, the king of the gods makes sure that all deities function properly, punish them for misdeeds, grant or take away immortality from lesser gods etc. Ex: Zeus, Odin, Anu.
 Divine rival: In some cases, there may be another god, who is equal in supernatural power and thinks he can do a better job than the current king. This often results in conflict, and in extreme cases, war. Ex: Ra and Apophis; Osiris, Set and Horus; Perun and Veles; Indra and the Asuras; Zeus and Poseidon; Cronos and Uranus; Typhon and Zeus etc.

See also

 Henotheism
 Kingship and kingdom of God

References

Gods by association
Mythological archetypes
Mythological kings
Polytheism